The McIntire Garrison House is a historic house on Cider Hill Road (Maine State Route 91) in York, Maine.  Built c. 1707, it is an extremely rare well-preserved example of a New England colonial log garrison house, built by settlers for defense against Native American attacks.  The house, possibly the oldest in the state, was designated a National Historic Landmark in 1968.

Description and history
The McIntire Garrison House is set on the south side of Cider Hill Road in a rural section of York, Maine, overlooking a bend in the York River. It is a two-story log structure, sheathed in wooden clapboards, with a side-gable roof pierced by a central chimney. The second floor projects slightly over the first floor on all four sides, one side of which has been fitted with a trapdoor to see below. The interior is very plain, with wooden floors, paneled walls, and unfinished ceilings. The extant windows are a later modification, and do not reflect period fenestration.

Traditional sources long maintained that the construction date of this house was in 1645.  However, architectural analysis in the 20th century has shown that it was built using methods not adopted until the early 18th century.  These types of houses were relatively common in southern Maine during the colonial period, when it was regularly subjected to attack by Native American forces (sometimes with French participation).  The building would not have been finished in clapboard at that time.  The building was subjected to a "restoration" by early architectural preservationists in the early 20th century, and more historically informed restoration later in the 20th century.

See also
List of National Historic Landmarks in Maine
List of the oldest buildings in Maine
National Register of Historic Places listings in York County, Maine

References

Houses completed in 1707
National Historic Landmarks in Maine
Houses on the National Register of Historic Places in Maine
Houses in York, Maine
National Register of Historic Places in York County, Maine
1707 establishments in the British Empire